Porto di Mare (literally Sea Port) is a station on Line 3 of the Milan Metro in Milan, Italy. The station was opened on 12 May 1991 as part of the extension of the line from Porta Romana to San Donato. It takes the name from a never-realized project of a fluvial port to reach the Po River and consequentially the Adriatic Sea.

The station is located at the ancient starting point of the Motorway of the Sun, which is in the municipality of Milan. This is an underground station with two tracks in a single tunnel.

References

Line 3 (Milan Metro) stations
Railway stations opened in 1991
1991 establishments in Italy
Railway stations in Italy opened in the 20th century